The Campos do Jordão Environmental Protection Area is a state-level environmental protection area in the state of São Paulo, Brazil.

Location

The Campos do Jordão Environmental Protection Area (APA) is in the municipality of Campos do Jordão, São Paulo.
The APA is located between the two largest urban centers in Brazil, São Paulo and Rio de Janeiro, and has great value for tourism, which is the main economic activity of the region.

Environment

The Campos do Jordão Environmental Protection Area is in the Mantiqueira Mountains.
The rugged terrain, vegetation and climate form an environment of great scenic and biological value. 
The landscape consists of steep slopes with scalloped escarpments, covered in vegetation in the transition between Atlantic Forest and the Araucaria Forest.
The Atlantic Forest includes a number of remnants of dense forest. The higher Araucaria Forest includes pines and alpine meadows.
Mammals include coati, capuchin monkey, peccary, jaguar, chipmunk, armadillo, brocket deer, opossum, bush dog and oncilla.

History 

The Campos do Jordão Environmental Protection Area was created by State Law 4.105 of 26 June 1984.
Implementation of the APA was to be coordinated by CONSEMA in collaboration with centralized or decentralized state environment agencies, the executive and legislative branches of the municipality, and the local community.
The purpose was to protect important Atlantic Forest ecosystems and water resources used by communities in São Paulo and Minas Gerais.
It forms a continuous area with the Sapucaí Mirim Environmental Protection Area.
The APA is part of the Mantiqueira Mosaic of conservation units.

Notes

Sources

Environmental protection areas of Brazil
Protected areas of São Paulo (state)
1994 establishments in Brazil